John Boswell (1947–1994) was an American historian, professor and writer.

John Boswell may also refer to:
John Boswell (freemason) (1532–1609), Scottish gentleman
John Boswell (physician) (1710–1780), Scottish physician
John Boswell (musician), American musician and video producer
John Boswell (publishing-business figure) (born 1945), American literary agent and author
John Boswell (rugby union) (1867–1948), Scottish rugby union player

See also 
 John Boswell Maver (born 1932), Australian pianist and composer
 John Boswall (1920–2011), British actor
 John Buswell (1909–1992), English cricketer